The Battle of Augustów was a battle on the Eastern Front of the First World War. It was fought between the Russian Empire and the German Empire in September 1914.

Prelude 
Following the retreat of the Russian 10th army in the Battle of Tannenberg, Russian forces found themselves defending the parameter of Augustów. The 10th army set up position at the bank of the Neman river.

Battle 
Fighting erupted against the German 8th Army on 12th of September as the German force attempt to cross the Nieman River against the Russians lead by General Evgeny Aleksandrovich Radkevich, whose force occupies the forest of Augustów. The German army's goal is to secure communications for the south of the bank.

Camouflaged Russian soldiers who had been transferred to the right bank of the Neman spotted German troops attempting to cross the river by constructing platoons and opened fire, sweeping hundreds of Germans into the river. A prolonged artillery duel followed, during which the Germans attempted to cross the river again over the pontoon bridge but failed.

The Germans then made a third attempt to cross the river in the evening, but were once again mowed down by Russian artillery. According to one report in the Evening Standard, approximately 20,000 German bodies were floating down the Neman. The Germans retreated eight miles, with the Russian Cossack soldiers in pursuit, leaving behind wounded soldiers, weapons, munitions and convoys.

Driven from the Neman, the Germans made desperate attempts to slow the offensive by Russian troops, and a battle took place near Augustów. The Germans were defeated by Russian artillery fire and bayonets, and were pushed back to the East Prussian border. According to Russian estimates, at least 65,000 Germans were killed, wounded or taken prisoner in total at the Battle of Augustów.

References 

Battles of World War I involving Germany
Battles of World War I involving Russia